Albert Jack Reece (1927 – 10 September 1966) was a New Zealand hockey player and cricketer, and umpire at both sports. 

Reece played hockey for Canterbury from 1946 to 1956, and represented New Zealand in 1948. He later became a hockey umpire, officiating in a Test between New Zealand and Pakistan in 1958.

Reece played in one first-class match for Canterbury in 1947/48. He umpired eight first-class matches, all of them at Lancaster Park, Christchurch, between 1959 and 1962.

Illness deprived him of his sight in the early 1960s, and he died in September 1966, aged 39.

See also
 List of Canterbury representative cricketers

References

External links
 

1927 births
1966 deaths
New Zealand cricketers
New Zealand male field hockey players
Canterbury cricketers
Cricketers from Christchurch
New Zealand cricket umpires
New Zealand field hockey umpires